"Forgiveness I + II" is a song by Canadian punk band Billy Talent. The song was initially released on November 27, 2019, as a standalone single, but was eventually included as the first single on their sixth album, Crisis of Faith. The song was written by Ben Kowalewicz, Ian D'Sa, Jonathan Gallant, and Jordan Hastings.

Background 
The song is broken into two sections; the first being "a badass, heavy, prog song", as Kowalewicz describes it, followed by a softer section that incorporate a horns section alongside the band. Part I was primarily written by D'Sa, which evoked feelings of "riding through a desert on horseback" from the rest of the band. Eventually taking inspiration from Paulo Coelho's novel, The Alchemist, the band leaned into these feelings more as they continued to develop the song. Kowalewicz described Part II as having more of a space rock feel to it, specifically comparing it to Pink Floyd.

Release and reception 
"Forgiveness I + II" released on November 27, 2019 alongside a lyric video. Following the song's release, it was revealed that it would not appear on the band's next album, however, it was included in the track listing for Crisis of Faith when the album was announced in 2021.

The song was met with mostly positive feedback, with many critics praising the guitars and vocals of the first half of the song. Mark Sutherland of Kerrang! called it a "six-minute prog rock odyssey", favorably comparing it to Muse for its electronic riffs. Ben Rayner of Toronto Star compared it to Rush, calling it "a multi-staged metallo-prog epic", and the band's most ambitious song to date.

Short film 
Alongside "Forgiveness I + II", the band partnered with Canadian director Michael Maxxis on a short film titled Forgiveness. The film stars UFC fighters Rose Namajunas and Donald Cerrone, and is set is a dystopian desert. The film was originally released in three parts on the band's YouTube channel, but the videos were later removed ahead of the film's premiere at the Santa Fe International Film Festival on October 21, 2022. The first two episodes break the songs into its respective parts, while the third episode uses the band's following single, "Reckless Paradise."

Personnel 
Billy Talent

 Ben Kowalewicz – lead vocals, songwriting
 Ian D'Sa – guitars, synthesizers, piano, backing vocals, producer
 Jonathan Gallant – bass, songwriting
 Jordan Hastings – drums, songwriting

Additional musician

 Dennis Passley – tenor saxophone
 Bruce Mackinnon – alto saxophone
 Ernesto Barahona – trombone
 Tom Moffet – trumpet

Production

 Rich Costey – mixing
 Eric Ratz – engineering
 Ted Jensen – mastering

Charts

References 

2019 singles
2019 songs
Billy Talent songs
Songs written by Ian D'Sa
Songs written by Benjamin Kowalewicz
Songs written by Jonathan Gallant